Bronka  (Bronka) is a village in the administrative district of Gmina Brańsk, within Bielsk County, Podlaskie Voivodeship, in north-eastern Poland.

According to the 1921 census, the village was inhabited by 234 people, among whom 228 were Roman Catholic, and 6 were Mosaic. At the same time, 228 inhabitants declared Polish nationality and 6 declared Jewish nationality. There were 41 residential buildings in the village.

References

Bronka